AVP may stand for:

Medicine
 Anthrax Vaccine Precipitated, a British anthrax vaccine
 Arginine vasopressin, the form of the antidiuretic hormone vasopressin found in most mammals

Popular culture
 Alien vs. Predator, a science fiction franchise
 Alien vs. Predator (film)

Organizations
 Alternatives to Violence Project
 Aruban People's Party (Arubaanse Volkspartij/Partido di Pueblo Arubano)
 Association of Volleyball Professionals
 National Coalition of Anti-Violence Programs, aka Anti-Violence Project/Program
 AVP Research Foundation

Facilities
 Wilkes-Barre/Scranton International Airport (IATA airport code AVP) in Avoca, Pennsylvania 
 Aylesbury Vale Parkway railway station (rail station code AVP)

Business
 Assistant/associate/area vice president, a title; see vice president
 Avon Products (stock ticker symbol AVP)

Transportation
 AVP, an IATA dangerous goods NOTOC code for "aquatic and live fish"
 AVP, a retired U.S. Navy hull classification code for "small seaplane tender"

Other uses
 Attribute–value pair, data representation in computing systems and applications
 Alternative vote plus, a voting system
 Atharvaveda-Paippalada, a recension of Atharvaveda

See also
 Alien vs. Predator (disambiguation)